Scott Fraser (born 24 April 1963) is a Scottish former professional footballer, who played for Rangers, East Fife, Berwick Rangers and Cowdenbeath in the Scottish Football League. He also played in Australia for three years, representing Green Gully, Heidelberg United and Fawkner Blues.

After ending his football career in the early 1990s, Fraser became involved in property investment. He co-founded property investment business McEwan Fraser, which subsequently became a main sponsor of Hibernian, as well as McEwan Fraser Legal, an estate agency based in Edinburgh.

Notes

External links

Scott Fraser at Aussie Footballers
McEwan Fraser
McEwan Fraser Legal

1963 births
Living people
Footballers from Edinburgh
Association football defenders
Scottish footballers
Scottish expatriate footballers
Expatriate soccer players in Australia
Scottish Football League players
National Soccer League (Australia) players
Berwick Rangers F.C. players
Cowdenbeath F.C. players
East Fife F.C. players
Rangers F.C. players
Heidelberg United FC players
21st-century Scottish businesspeople